The 2007 Portuguese Social Democratic Party leadership election was held on 28 September 2007. This was a snap leadership election called by then party leader Luís Marques Mendes, elected in April 2005. Marques Mendes triggered the snap leadership ballot after the PSD bad result in the July 2007 Lisbon mayoral by-election, in which the PSD candidate, Fernando Negrão, polled 3rd place with just 16% of the votes. Marques Mendes decided to run for reelection and faced Luís Filipe Menezes in the leadership ballot. On election day, Menezes defeated Marques Mendes by a 54% to 43% margin and was elected as the new leader of the PSD.

Menezes leadership was, however, very short and in April 2008 he announced his resignation and exit from the leadership.

Candidates

Results

See also
 Social Democratic Party (Portugal)
 List of political parties in Portugal
 Elections in Portugal

References

External links
PSD Official Website

2007 in Portugal
Political party leadership elections in Portugal
2007 elections in Portugal
Portuguese Social Democratic Party leadership election